Vojtěchov  may refer to places in the Czech Republic:

Vojtěchov (Chrudim District), a municipality and village in the Pardubice Region
Vojtěchov, a village and part of Lísek in the Vysočina Region
Vojtěchov, a village and part of Mšeno in the Central Bohemian Region